Rexea solandri, the silver gemfish, is a species of snake mackerel found in the southwestern Pacific Ocean around Australia and New Zealand with reports of possible records from Madagascar and Japan. Gemfish appear as infrequent, but regular bycatch species in pelagic longline fisheries for tuna in the waters around the Hawaiian archipelago and American Samoa. This species can reach a length of up to  SL and a maximum weight of  has been recorded. This species is important to local commercial fisheries.

References

External links
 Photograph

Gempylidae
Fish described in 1832
Taxa named by Georges Cuvier